Al Marqab may refer to:

 Al-Marqab University, in Libya
 Murqub, a district in northern Libya
 Al Marqab, Saudi Arabia, a village subsumed by Riyadh, now a neighborhood in southcentral Riyadh
 Al-Marqab Castle, a crusader castle between Tartous and Latakia in Syria
 Al Marqab, Yemen, a village in western Yemen